The Song of the Lark is an 1884 painting by Jules Breton owned by and exhibited at the Art Institute of Chicago, part of the Henry Field Memorial Collection.

At the Century of Progress, the 1934 Chicago World's Fair, First Lady Eleanor Roosevelt unveiled The Song of the Lark as the winner of the Chicago Daily News contest to find the "most beloved work of art in America". She declared it her personal favorite painting, saying "At this moment The Song of the Lark had come to represent the popular American artistic taste on a national level."

In popular culture
Willa Cather's 1915 novel The Song of the Lark takes its name from the painting, which is also used as the novel's cover art.

In February 2014, actor Bill Murray said at a press event for the film, The Monuments Men, that a chance encounter with The Song of the Lark at the Art Institute of Chicago helped him in his early career when he was contemplating suicide.

References

1884 paintings
Farming in art
Sun in art
Paintings in the collection of the Art Institute of Chicago